Patrick Douglas "Pat" Mountain (born 1 August 1976) is a Welsh former professional footballer who played as a goalkeeper. He has been goalkeeping coach for Bristol City since 2019.

Background

Born in Pontypridd, Pat grew up in Llantwit Major. He won three schoolboy international caps.

Club career

Mountain began his career at Barry Town and appeared for them in the UEFA Cup where he helped them to a win over BVSC Budapest before bring eliminated by Aberdeen. His impressive performances caused Cardiff City to take notice and he signed for them on a non-contract basis as cover. Following an injury to the first choice goalkeeper he started a handful of games for the Bluebirds, making his debut in a 2–1 defeat against Mansfield Town. During his time at the club he went on loan to Barry Town eventually returning to them on a permanent deal. He left Barry Town to sign for Yeovil Town in 1998 and eventually moved on to Newport County via Gloucester City. He went on to make over 200 appearances for the side and won player of the year awards on two separate occasions .

He was eventually forced to retire at the age of just 27 due to persistent knee problems which, despite having three major operations on, he could not recover from.

International career

Mountain has represented Wales in four different age levels and is a former Wales U21 international and was a regular in the side for several years.

After retirement

After being forced to retire from playing through injury, Mountain obtained UEFA's outfield and goalkeeping coaching 'A' licences. He is also an FA accredited tutor of goalkeepers and has both their 'A' and 'B' licence qualifications.

Mountain started his coaching career at Cardiff City working with the academy goalkeepers before moving on to work with Cheltenham Town and 
Hereford United as first team goalkeeper coach.

On 7 August 2008 it was confirmed that Mountain had signed for Football League Championship club Wolverhampton Wanderers as their Goalkeeper Coach replacing Bobby Mimms. Mountain has worked with former Wolves associates in John Ward, Keith Downing and Graham Turner.

On 20 June 2017, Mountain was appointed as Goalkeeping Coach for Hull City.

On 22 January 2018, Mountain left Hull City for family reasons, taking up a similar position at Forest Green Rovers.

On 14 June 2019, he became Goalkeeping Coach at EFL Championship Side Bristol City F.C.

References

External links

1976 births
Living people
Footballers from Pontypridd
Welsh footballers
Wales under-21 international footballers
Barry Town United F.C. players
Cardiff City F.C. players
Yeovil Town F.C. players
Gloucester City A.F.C. players
Newport County A.F.C. players
English Football League players
Cardiff City F.C. non-playing staff
Cheltenham Town F.C. non-playing staff
Bristol City F.C. non-playing staff
Wolverhampton Wanderers F.C. non-playing staff
Hull City A.F.C. non-playing staff
Forest Green Rovers F.C. non-playing staff
Association football goalkeepers
Association football goalkeeping coaches